Mehmet Ataullah Bey, also known as Ata Atalay (1882–1933) was a politician and a member of the last Ottoman Parliament in 1920.

References

1882 births
1933 deaths
People from Nevşehir
Politicians of the Ottoman Empire